Godapitiya Central College is a national school located in Matara, Sri Lanka. Though it was originally a Buddhist school, it is now run by the government of Sri Lanka. It was one of the first schools converted to a national school. Godapitiya Central College serves students from grade 6 to grade 13.

References

National schools in Sri Lanka
Schools in Matara District